Me & My Brother is the third studio album by Atlanta-based rap duo Ying Yang Twins released on September 16, 2003. The album debuted at #11 on the Billboard 200 with approximately 62,000 copies sold in the first week released. It remained on the charts for 54 weeks and was certified 2× platinum by the RIAA with an excess of 2 million copies sold. The album also features their biggest hit, the Lil Jon-assisted "Salt Shaker", which reached #9 on the Billboard Hot 100.

Track listing
 "Them Braves" - 1:20
 "Hanh!" - 4:04
 "What's Happenin!" (featuring Trick Daddy) - 4:20
 "Grey Goose" (produced by Lil Jon) - 5:32
 "Salt Shaker" (featuring Lil Jon & The East Side Boyz) (produced by Lil Jon) - 4:12
 "Georgia Dome (Get Low Sequel)" - 6:06
 "What the Fuck!" (featuring Bone Crusher & Killer Mike) - 4:54
 "Calling All Zones" (featuring Hitman Sammy Sam & Khujo Goodie) - 5:19
 "Me & My Brother" - 6:27
 "Hard" (featuring K.T.; produced by Derrick Williams) - 4:55
 "The Nerve Calmer" - 1:35
 "Naggin'" - 4:24
 "Naggin', Pt. 2 (The Answer)" (Performed by Ms. Flawless & Tha Rhythum) - 4:25
 "Armageddon" - 4:04

Notes
All tracks produced by Mr. Collipark aka Beat In Azz, except tracks #4 #5 and #10.

Charts

Weekly charts

Year-end charts

References

2003 albums
Albums produced by Mr. Collipark
Ying Yang Twins albums
TVT Records albums